is a Japanese professional footballer who plays midfielder for ReinMeer Aomori in the Japan Football League.

Career
On 24 March 2013 Iwama started in V-Varen Nagasaki's first match in the J2 League against Matsumoto Yamaga in which he started and played the whole 90 minutes as Nagasaki drew the match 1–1.

On 28 June 2022, Iwama was loaned to JFL club, ReinMeer Aomori during for mid 2022 season.

In 2023, Iwama announcement officially permanently transfer to ReinMeer Aomori after on loan a season in 2022 has been confirmed from Fujieda MYFC.

Career statistics

Club
Updated to the start from 2023 season.

References

External links 
Profile at Matsumoto Yamaga
Profile at V-Varen Nagasaki
Profile at ReinMeer Aomori

1986 births
Living people
Association football people from Tokyo
Japanese footballers
J1 League players
J2 League players
J3 League players
Japan Football League players
Arte Takasaki players
V-Varen Nagasaki players
Matsumoto Yamaga FC players
Tochigi SC players
Fujieda MYFC players
ReinMeer Aomori players
Association football midfielders